Liverpool Hospital is located in the South Western Sydney suburb of Liverpool, New South Wales, Australia and is a 50-minute drive from the Sydney CBD. It is the second largest hospital in New South Wales (behind Westmead Hospital) and one of the leading trauma centres in Australia.

It has a maximum capacity of 960 beds, 23 operating rooms and 60 critical care beds, diagnostic and imaging services, emergency and trauma care, maternity, paediatric, cancer care, mental health, ambulatory care, allied health and medical and surgical services from birth to aged care.

The hospital is the major health service for South Western Sydney, providing services to the local government area of Liverpool City Council as well as district services to residents and visitors in the area. It also provides a range of statewide services in areas such as critical care and trauma, neonatal intensive care and brain injury rehabilitation.

Liverpool Hospital sits within an education and health precinct which includes the Ingham Institute of Applied Medical Research, Clinical Schools of the University of New South Wales and Western Sydney University, South West Private Hospital and South Western Sydney TAFE.

It is a principal teaching hospital of the University of New South Wales and the Western Sydney University and continues to have an active education programme for medical practitioners, nurses and health professionals, with a range of clinical placements available for students from universities around Australia.

See also 
 Health care in Australia
 Lists of hospitals
 List of hospitals in Australia

References

External links
 Liverpool Hospital
 Liverpool Hospital 200 year anniversary
 South Western Sydney Local Health District

Hospitals in Sydney
Hospital buildings completed in 1813
Teaching hospitals in Australia
Hospitals established in the 1790s